Lynn Margaret Batten  (1948 – 28 July 2022) was a Canadian-Australian mathematician known for her books about finite geometry and cryptography, and for her research on the classification of malware.

Education and career
Batten earned her Ph.D. at the University of Waterloo in 1977.
Her dissertation was D-Partition Geometries.

Formerly the Associate Dean for Academic and Industrial Research at the University of Manitoba, she holds the Deakin Chair in Mathematics at Deakin University in Australia, where she directs the information security group.

Books
Combinatorics of Finite Geometries (Cambridge University Press, 1986; 2nd ed., 1997)
The Theory of Finite Linear Spaces: Combinatorics of Points and Lines (with Albrecht Beutelspacher, Cambridge University Press 1993)
Public Key Cryptography: Applications and Attacks (Wiley, 2013)

References

External links
Home page

1948 births
Living people
Australian mathematicians
Canadian mathematicians
Women mathematicians
University of Waterloo alumni
Academic staff of the University of Manitoba
Academic staff of Deakin University